Nestlé Lanka (previously known as Nestlé Ceylon Company) is a Sri Lanka-based foods company located in Colombo, Sri Lanka. Nestlé Lanka is a subsidiary of Nestlé, a Switzerland based company. Nestlé's products include baby food, medical food, bottled water, breakfast cereals, coffee and tea. The company was founded by Anglo-Swiss Condensed Milk Company in 1906 and incorporated under Nestlé Ceylon Company. Nestlé Lanka is Sri Lanka largest foods company by revenue, with Rs 36.355 billion in 2019. The whole company is controlled by the Nestlé Switzerland parent company. Nestlé S.A. owns over 90 per cent total shares. Nestlé Lanka PLC became the seventh most valuable brand in Sri Lanka worth approximately Rs 21 billion in 2017.

Nestlé Lanka was listed on the Colombo Stock Exchange in 1981. The company has 1,200 employees and 23,000 distributors, suppliers and farmers. The company was renamed in 1980 as Nestlé Lanka PLC before listing Stock Exchange.

History 
Nestlé Lanka was established in 1906 as Nestlé Ceylon Company one year after merged Anglo-Swiss Condensed Milk Company in British Ceylon. The company was incorporated under Nestlé Ceylon Company to Nestlé Lanka PLC 1980. Sri Lanka has been an agricultural based country. British Empire helped boost agricultural production. The British government first cocoa plant introduce to Ceylon in early 1890. Early 20th-century raw cocoa exported Switzerland. Chocolate became popular government want to start the local chocolate market, in between this time Anglo-Swiss Condensed Milk Company established a branch in Sri Lanka early 1906. Sri Lankan history Nestlé become most successful food company. Company brought numerous international brand such as Milo, Nescafé, Cerelac, KitKat and Maggi. Company-sponsored by local sports events and school sports tournaments. Nestlé Lanka PLC won numerous awards and become a number one company past hundred years. Post COVID-19 period Nestlé stock price drop 50% than previous year. Nestlé export most of their product such as Maggi Coconut Milk Nestomalt and Milo.

Brands and products 
Nestlé Lanka is the market leader in Sri Lanka foods products with a presence in over 20 food categories such as tea, milk, chocolate, cereal and fast food amongst others with over 20 million local customers consumption.

See also 

 List of food companies
 List of largest companies in Sri Lanka

References 

1906 establishments in Ceylon
Food and drink companies of Sri Lanka
Companies listed on the Colombo Stock Exchange